Jeremy Barnes (born September 18, 1976) is an American musician. He plays accordion, percussion and other instruments. He has been a member of the bands Neutral Milk Hotel, Beirut, and A Hawk and a Hacksaw, and is a co-creator of the record label L.M. Duplication. Influences on his work include music from Eastern Europe, Turkey, and the Caucasus.

Career
Barnes was born in Albuquerque, New Mexico, the son of a local businessman. In 1995 he moved to Chicago to attend DePaul University but left his studies in January 1996, aged 19. He joined Neutral Milk Hotel, which was a part of the Athens, Georgia-based Elephant 6 music collective. Neutral Milk Hotel disbanded in 1998 and Barnes spent time traveling in Europe and working as a postman. He also played with Broadcast, The Gerbils and Bablicon.

Barnes cites his initial introduction to Eastern European music as having been in 1999 while on tour. After being introduced to Bulgarian music, he lived in a predominantly Ukrainian Chicago neighborhood and developed an interest in Romanian music.

"I was kind of at a dead end in what I was listening to, and it just opened up a whole new world for me," he said in a 2011 interview with Noise Narcs. "That was in 1999.  For a while it affected the way I looked at my music, but I was still playing drums in bands, and it didn’t seem like something I should pursue. You go through these fads or trends as a listener, where you’re really into something for a month and then it changes. But with this music, it’s been now twelve years or more, and it gradually seeped into everything that I do."

In 2001 he formed A Hawk and a Hacksaw, in France.  In 2005 he met Heather Trost, who performs with him in A Hawk and A Hacksaw.  Both Barnes and Trost contributed to the debut album by Beirut, Gulag Orkestar.

A Hawk and A Hacksaw's recording and touring line-up over the years has included Hungarian, Romanian, and English musicians, notably Fanfare Cioclaria, Ferenc Kovacs, Balász Unger, Chris Hladowski, and Kalman Balogh.   One recent touring iteration included Chicagoans Samuel Johnson, who played trumpet, and George Lawler on the doumbek.

Barnes and Trost are married and live in Albuquerque. They created the label L.M. Duplication to release their own recordings as well as music by other folk-related groups. Barnes has said he intends to release contemporary music as well as earlier music that is no longer available. They have released home recordings by John Jacob Niles, an album of Turkish wedding music by Cüneyt Sepetçi and Orchestra Dolapdere, and a compilation of music from the Caucasus Mountains, called Mountains of Tongues.

Barnes and Deerhoof guitarist John Dieterich released duo album called The Coral Casino, under the moniker Dieterich & Barnes in 2016. In the same year, Barnes released a collection of solo recordings, called Summer '16.

In Neutral Milk Hotel, Barnes played a four-piece C&C drum kit (24-inch bass drum) Paiste Giant Beat and Istanbul Agop Cymbals, and a Wurlitzer MLM organ. In A Hawk and A Hacksaw, he plays vintage Da Vinci, Dallape and Weltmeister Supita Accordions and the Iranian santur.

Releases
 Excerpts from a Janitor's Almanac (CD) – Self-released – 2001
 A Hawk and a Hacksaw (CD/LP) – Cloud Recordings – 2002
 Darkness at Noon (CD/LP) – The Leaf Label – 2005
 The Way the Wind Blows (CD/LP) – The Leaf Label – 2006
 And the Hun Hangar Ensemble (CD/LP) – The Leaf Label – 2007
 Foni Tu Argile (10" single) – The Leaf Label – 2009
 Délivrance (CD/LP) – The Leaf Label – 2009
 You Have Already Gone to the Other World (CD/LP) – 2013
 Forest Bathing (CD/LP) – 2018

Living Music (L.M.) Duplication releases
 Cervantine {A Hawk and A Hacksaw} (CD/LP) – L.M. Duplication – 2011
 The Boone-Tolliver Recordings John Jacob Niles (CD/LP) – 2012
 You Have Already Gone to the Other World [A Hawk and A Hacksaw] – 2013
 Bahriye Ciftetellesi [Cüneyt Sepetçi and Orchestra Dolapdere] – 2013
 Mountains of Tongues- Musical Dialects of the Caucasus – 2013
 Bahto Delo Delo- Tsagoi – 2014
 Dieterich & Barnes- The Coral Casino- 2016
 Thor & Friends -s/t – 2016
 Convertino~Amor - The Western Suite & Siesta Songs – 2016

References 

The Elephant 6 Recording Company artists
DePaul University alumni
Living people
1976 births
20th-century American drummers
American male drummers
21st-century American drummers
20th-century American male musicians
21st-century American male musicians
Beirut (band) members
A Hawk and a Hacksaw members
Neutral Milk Hotel members